This is a list of the fundamental frequencies in hertz (cycles per second) of the keys of a modern 88-key standard or 108-key extended piano in twelve-tone equal temperament, with the 49th key, the fifth A (called A4), tuned to 440 Hz (referred to as A440).  Since every octave is made of twelve steps and since a jump of one octave doubles the frequency (for example, the fifth A is 440 Hz and the sixth A is 880 Hz), each successive pitch is derived by multiplying (ascending) or dividing (descending) the frequency of the previous pitch by the twelfth root of two (approximately 1.059463). For example, to get the frequency one semitone up from A4 (A4), multiply 440 by the twelfth root of two. To go from A4 to B4 (up one whole tone, or two semitones), multiply 440 twice by the twelfth root of two (or once by the sixth root of two, approximately 1.122462). To go from A4 to C5 (which is a minor third), multiply 440 three times by the twelfth root of two (or once by the fourth root of two, approximately 1.189207). For other tuning schemes refer to musical tuning.

This list of frequencies is for a theoretically ideal piano. On an actual piano the ratio between semitones is slightly larger, especially at the high and low ends, where string stiffness causes inharmonicity, i.e., the tendency for the harmonic makeup of each note to run sharp. To compensate for this, octaves are tuned slightly wide, stretched according to the inharmonic characteristics of each instrument. This deviation from equal temperament is called the Railsback curve.

The following equation gives the frequency  of the th key, as shown in the table:

(a' = A4 = A440 is the 49th key on the idealized standard piano)

Alternatively, this can be written as:

Conversely, starting from a frequency on the idealized standard piano tuned to A440, one obtains the key number by:

List
 

Values in bold are exact on an ideal piano. Keys shaded gray are rare and only appear on extended pianos. The normally included 88 keys have been numbered 1–88, with the extra low keys numbered 89–97 and the extra high keys numbered 98–108. (A 108-key piano that extends from C0 to B8 was first built in 2018 by Stuart & Sons.)

See also
 Piano tuning
 Scientific pitch notation
 Music and mathematics

References

External links
 interactive piano frequency table – A PHP script allowing the reference pitch of A4 to be altered from 440 Hz.
 PySynth – A simple Python-based software synthesizer that prints the key frequencies table and then creates a few demo songs based on that table.
 "Keyboard and frequencies", SengpielAudio.com.
 Notefreqs – A complete table of note frequencies and ratios for midi, piano, guitar, bass, and violin. Includes fret measurements (in cm and inches) for building instruments.

Piano
Musical tuning